In mathematics, Landau's function g(n), named after Edmund Landau, is defined for every natural number n to be the largest order of an element of the symmetric group Sn. Equivalently, g(n) is the largest least common multiple (lcm) of any partition of n, or the maximum number of times a permutation of n elements can be recursively applied to itself before it returns to its starting sequence.

For instance, 5 = 2 + 3 and lcm(2,3) = 6. No other partition of 5 yields a bigger lcm, so g(5) = 6. An element of order 6 in the group S5 can be written in cycle notation as (1 2) (3 4 5). Note that the same argument applies to the number 6, that is, g(6) = 6. There are arbitrarily long sequences of consecutive numbers n, n + 1, …, n + m on which the function g is constant.

The integer sequence g(0) = 1, g(1) = 1, g(2) = 2, g(3) = 3, g(4) = 4, g(5) = 6, g(6) = 6, g(7) = 12, g(8) = 15, ...  is named after Edmund Landau, who proved in 1902 that

(where ln denotes the natural logarithm).  Equivalently (using little-o notation), .

The statement that

for all sufficiently large n, where Li−1 denotes the inverse of the logarithmic integral function, is equivalent to the Riemann hypothesis.

It can be shown that

with the only equality between the functions at n = 0, and indeed

Notes

References 
E. Landau, "Über die Maximalordnung der Permutationen gegebenen Grades [On the maximal order of permutations of given degree]", Arch. Math. Phys. Ser. 3, vol. 5, 1903.
W. Miller, "The maximum order of an element of a finite symmetric group", American Mathematical Monthly, vol. 94, 1987, pp. 497–506.
J.-L. Nicolas, "On Landau's function g(n)", in The Mathematics of Paul Erdős, vol. 1, Springer-Verlag, 1997, pp. 228–240.

External links

Group theory
Permutations
Arithmetic functions